The Central Criminal Court of England and Wales, commonly referred to as the Old Bailey after the street on which it stands, is a criminal court building in central London, one of several that house the Crown Court of England and Wales. The street outside follows the route of the ancient wall around the City of London, which was part of the fortification's bailey, hence the metonymic name.

The Old Bailey has been housed in a succession of court buildings on the street since the sixteenth century, when it was attached to the medieval Newgate gaol. The current main building block was completed in 1902, designed by Edward William Mountford; its architecture is recognised and protected as a Grade II* listed building. An extension South Block was constructed in 1972, over the former site of Newgate gaol which was demolished in 1904.

The Crown Court sitting in the Old Bailey hears major criminal cases from within Greater London. In exceptional cases, trials may be referred to the Old Bailey from other parts of England and Wales. As with most courts in England and Wales, trials at the Old Bailey are open to the public; however, they are subject to stringent security procedures.

History

The court originated as the sessions house of the Lord Mayor and Sheriffs of the City of London and of Middlesex. In addition to sessions court, the Old Bailey also held trials, similar to the traveling Courts of Assize held in other parts of England and Wales. The original medieval court was first mentioned in 1585; it was next to the older Newgate Prison, and seems to have grown out of the endowment to improve the gaol and rooms for the sheriffs, made possible by a gift from Richard Whittington. It was destroyed in the Great Fire of London in 1666 and rebuilt in 1674, with the court open to the weather to prevent the spread of disease.

In 1734, it was refronted, enclosing the court and reducing the influence of spectators: this led to outbreaks of typhus, notably in 1750 when 60 people died, including the Lord Mayor and two judges. It was rebuilt again in 1774 and a second courtroom was added in 1824. Over 100,000 criminal trials were carried out at the Old Bailey between 1674 and 1834.

In 1834, it was renamed as the Central Criminal Court and its jurisdiction extended beyond that of London and Middlesex to the whole of the English jurisdiction for trials of major cases. His Majesty's Courts and Tribunals Service manages the courts and administers the trials but the building itself is owned by the City of London Corporation, which finances the building, the running of it, the staff and the maintenance out of their own resources.

The court was envisaged as that where only criminals accused of crimes committed in the City and Middlesex were tried. However, in 1856, there was public revulsion at complaints sent to police against doctor William Palmer that he was a poisoner and murderer. This led to fears that he could not receive a fair trial in his native Staffordshire. The Central Criminal Court Act 1856 was passed to enable his trial, and others with a public profile, to be held at the Old Bailey.

The Old Bailey adjoined Newgate Prison until the jail's 1902 closure. Hangings were a public spectacle in the street outside until May 1868. The condemned would be led along Dead Man's Walk between the buildings, and many were buried in the walk itself. Large, rowdy crowds sometimes gathered and pelted the condemned with rotten fruit and vegetables and stones. After 28 people were crushed to death when a pie-seller's stall overturned, a secret tunnel was made between the prison and St Sepulchre's church opposite the crossroads, to allow the chaplain to minister to the condemned without having to force his way through crowds.

The present building dates from 1902 and was officially opened by King Edward VII on 27 February 1907. It was designed by E. W. Mountford and co-occupies the site of the demolished prison. Above the main entrance is inscribed the admonition: "Defend the Children of the Poor & Punish the Wrongdoer".

On the dome above the court stands the court's symbolic gilt bronze statue of Lady Justice by sculptor F. W. Pomeroy (made 1905–1906). She holds a sword in her right hand and the scales of justice in her left. The statue is popularly supposed to show blind Justice, but the figure is not blindfolded: the courthouse brochures explain that this is because Lady Justice was originally not blindfolded, and because her "maidenly form" is supposed to guarantee her impartiality which renders the blindfold redundant.

During the Blitz of World War II, the Old Bailey was bombed and severely damaged, but reconstruction work restored most of it in the early 1950s. In 1952, the restored interior of the Grand or Great Hall of the Central Criminal Court was once again open. This hall (underneath the dome) is decorated with paintings commemorating the Blitz, as well as quasi-historical scenes of St Paul's Cathedral with nobles outside. Running around the entire hall are a series of axioms, some of biblical reference. They read:

Between 1968 and 1972, a new South Block, designed by the architects Donald McMorran and George Whitby, was built to accommodate more modern courts.

In 1973, the Belfast Brigade of the Provisional IRA exploded a car bomb in the street outside, killing one and injuring 200 people. A shard of glass is preserved as a reminder, embedded in the wall at the top of the main stairs.

The hall (and its floor) was decorated with many busts and statues, chiefly of British monarchs, but also of legal figures, and those who achieved renown by campaigning for improvement in prison conditions from 1700 to 1900. This part of the building also housed the stenographers' offices until the stenographers were replaced by technology in March 2012.

Management 
Until 2017, the court manager was known by the title of the Secondary of the City of London, an ancient title of a City officer.

Judges

All judges sitting in the Old Bailey are addressed as "My Lord" or "My Lady" whether they are High Court, circuit judges or recorders. The Lord Mayor and aldermen of the City of London are entitled to sit on the judges' bench during a hearing but do not participate in hearings. Where a ceremonial tradition is followed, a judge, sitting sole, sits off-centre in case the Lord Mayor were to decide to come in, who would take the centre chair. The most senior permanent judge of the Central Criminal Court has the title of Recorder of London, and their deputy has the title of Common Serjeant of London. The position of "Recorder of London" is distinct from that of a recorder, which is a part-time judicial office, holders of which sit part-time as judges of the Crown Court or County Court. Many criminal law advocates with QC/KC status and leading profiles sit as recorders across the London region. The recent Recorders of London have been:

 1975–1990 – Sir James Miskin
 1990–1998 – Sir Lawrence Verney
 1998–2004 – Michael Hyam
 2004–2013 – Peter Beaumont
 2013–2015 – Brian Barker
 2015–2019 – Nicholas Hilliard
 2020–present – Mark Lucraft

Civic role 

The court house originated as part of the City of London's borough judicial system, and it remains so. The Recorder and the Common Serjeant are City officers, and the Recorder is a member of the Common Council because he is also a member of the Court of Aldermen. The city's sheriffs and the Lord Mayor are justices there, but their jurisdiction is now nominal. The sheriffs are resident with the senior judges in the complex. In Court 1 are benches set aside for the committee of Bridge House Estates, the owner of the building.

In popular culture
The Old Bailey has been mentioned and featured in numerous fictional works including film, video games and literature. Notable examples include V for Vendetta and its film adaptation, in which the title character demolishes it to gain the public's attention, and Justice League and its director's cut, in which Wonder Woman foils a terrorist bomb plot. In Agatha Christie's play, Witness for the Prosecution, the murder trial of Leonard Vole is held at the Old Bailey. It is also a central location in The Great Ace Attorney: Adventures and its sequel The Great Ace Attorney 2: Resolve, where many of the trials in the games' plot take place. Rumpole of the Bailey is a British television series created and written by the British writer and barrister John Mortimer. Horace Rumpole, is an elderly London barrister who defends a broad variety of clients, often underdogs. In The Pirates of Penzance, upon defeating the police, the pirates declare that "No pirate band will take its stand / At the Central Criminal Court."

Gallery

See also

 Bow Street Magistrates' Court
 Courts of England and Wales
 Horseferry Road Magistrates' Court
 Royal Courts of Justice

References

External links

 Court information
 HM Courts Service – current cases listed at this court
 The Proceedings of the Old Bailey London 1674 to 1913 – Archive of case details
 Central Criminal Court from the City of London website
 Old Bailey photographs at 100 years old (from BBC)
 From Rumpole to the Ripper, Crippen to the Krays: The Old Bailey turns 100, Duncan Campbell, The Guardian, 27 February 2007
 View from Google Maps
 Copy of Sunday Times article including rare picture of Grand Hall
 Voices from the Old Bailey – BBC Radio 4 dramatisations of 18th century cases

 
Old Bailey, The
Crown Court buildings
Edwardian architecture in London
Grade II* listed buildings in the City of London
Grade II* listed government buildings
Government buildings with domes
Old Bailey, The
1907 establishments in England